Hansdiha is a village in the Saraiyahat community development block which is an administrative division in the Dumka Sadar subdivision of the Dumka district, Jharkhand state of India.

Geography

Location
Hansdiha is located in the northeast region of Jharkhand and located near Bihar border. Hansdiha is located on National Highway 133 between Deoghar and Godda in the Dumka district in Jharkhand state.

Overview
The map shows a large area, which is a plateau with low hills, except in the eastern portion where the Rajmahal hills intrude into this area and the Ramgarh hills are there.  The south-western portion is just a rolling upland. The entire area is overwhelmingly rural with only small pockets of urbanisation.

Note: The full screen map is interesting. All places marked on the map are linked in the full screen map and one can easily move on to another page of his/her choice. Enlarge the full screen map to see what else is there – one gets railway connections, many more road connections and so on.

Demographics 
As per 2011 Census of India, Hansdiha had a total population of 4,182 of which 2,210 (53%) were males and 1,972 (47%) were females. Population below 6 years was 705. The literacy rate was 78.29% of the population over 6 years. The sex ratio was 892 females per thousand males.

Civic administration

Police station
There is a police station at Hansdiha.

Transport 
Roads from Dumka, Deoghar, Godda and Bhagalpur intersect at Hansdiha. NH 133 connects Deoghar and Godda. Dumka and Bhagalpur are connected by State Highway which may be upgraded to National Highway. The Dumka-Bhagalpur broad gauge railway line via Mandar Hill connects the village. Hansdiha railway station is located just north of the village.

Education 
 Jawahar Navodaya Vidalaya for Dumka district is located on southern outskirt of Hansdiha. It was established in 1986. 
 Phulo-Jhano Murmu College Of Dairy Technology established in 2019 and affiliated to Birsa Agricultural University, Ranchi.
 Bechu Raut Inter College.

References 

Villages in Dumka district